

Hans-Joachim Löser (4 April 1918 – 13 February 2001) was an officer the Wehrmacht during World War II. He was also a recipient of the Knight's Cross of the Iron Cross. Löser joined the Bundeswehr in 1956 and retired in 1974 as a Generalmajor.

Awards and decorations

 Knight's Cross of the Iron Cross on 23 October 1941 as Hauptmann and commander of the III./Füsilier-Regiment 230

References

Citations

Bibliography

 

1918 births
2001 deaths
Military personnel from Weimar
Bundeswehr generals
Recipients of the Knight's Cross of the Iron Cross
People from Saxe-Weimar-Eisenach
Major generals of the German Army